Stepnovsky (masculine), Stepnovskaya (feminine), or Stepnovskoye (neuter) may refer to:
Stepnovsky District, a district of Stavropol Krai, Russia
Stepnovsky (rural locality), a rural locality (a settlement) in Volgograd Oblast, Russia